Leon Pape (8 February 1925 – 2 January 1984) was a medical physicist who received his BSc, MSc (1953) and PhD (1965) in Physics from the University of Southern California.  He became certified in radiological physics by the American Board of Radiology and from 1955-1962 he worked as a radiological physicist at the Cedars of Lebanon Hospital in Los Angeles. He served at the California State University Los Angeles as Radiation Safety Officer and as Professor of Physics until 1971, and worked on the development of studies in biophysics, radiological health physics, and electron microscopy. He was elevated to Departmental Head of Physics at Cal State Los Angeles, and advocated with the California legislature to secure adequate funding for the 4-MeV Van de Graaf Laboratory, unique to CSU system.  From 1971 until his death he worked at the August Krogh Institute at the University of Copenhagen, Denmark, in the Zoophysiological Laboratory. His central research area was membrane biophysics.

Select Published Works

Thesis
Pape, L. (1953). Report on investigation of asymmetrical resonance pressure broadening of the helium lambda5875 line.

Dissertation
Pape, L. (1965). Investigation of Some Structurally Related Characteristics of the Urinary Glycoprotein of Tamm and Horsfall (Doctoral dissertation, University of Southern California).

Articles

 Pape, Leon; Baker, S.; Gildenhorn, Hyman L.  A Technic for Cross-Calibration of X-Ray Units Utilizing Half-Value-Layer Determinations 
 Jacobs, Melville L.; Pape, Leon  Dosimetry for a Total-Body Irradiation Chamber 
 Springer, Elliott B.; Pape, Leon; Elsner, Fred; Jacobs, Melville L.  High-Energy Radiography (Cobalt 60 and Cesium 137) for Tumor Localization and Treatment Planning

Leon Pape Memorial Lecture Series
The Leon Pape Memorial Lecture Series was inaugurated by CSU after his "untimely death in January 1984 prompted the establishment of this lecture series in his memory, encompassing his many interests."  The award of this Lectureship is highly prestigious, with many Nobel Laureates and prominent academics having delivered it since its inception.

1984 : "Radioactivity in the Service of Humanity"
Rosalyn S. Yalow, Nobel Laureate in Physiology or Medicine, 1977. Senior Medical Investigator, Veterans Administration Medical Center, New York
1985 : "Science Is With People: A Tribute to Leon Pape"
Paul Saltman, Professor of Biology, University of California, San Diego
1986 : "The Dilemma of Nuclear Weapons"
Marvin L. Goldberger, President and Professor of Physics, California Institute of Technology
1987 : "How Old is the Observable Universe?"
William A. Fowler, Nobel Laureate in Physics, 1983, Institute Professor of Physics, Emeritus, California Institute of Technology
1988 : "The Nature of Metals and Alloys"
Linus Pauling, Nobel Laureate in Chemistry, 1954, Nobel Laureate in Peace, 1962, Research Professor, Linus Pauling Institute of Science and Medicine
1989 : "The Life of the Stars"
Hans A. Bethe, Nobel Laureate in Physics, 1967, Professor Emeritus of Physics, Cornell University
1990 : "A Brief History of the First 15 Billion Years"
Leon M. Lederman, Nobel Laureate in Physics, 1988, Director Emeritus, Fermi National Accelerator Laboratory and Professor of Physics, University of Chicago
1991 : "Visual Awareness"
Francis H.C. Crick, Nobel Laureate in Physiology or Medicine, 1962, J.W. Kieckhefer Distinguished Research Professor, Salk Institute for Biological Studies
1992 : "Simplicity and Complexity"
Murray Gell-Mann, Nobel Laureate in Physics, 1969, Robert Andrews Millikan Professor of Theoretical Physics, California Institute of Technology
1993 : "The Challenge of Drug Discovery"
Gertrude B. Elion, Nobel Laureate in Physiology or Medicine, 1988, Scientist Emeritus, Burroughs Wellcome Company
1994 : "Black Holes and Time Warps: Einstein's Outrageous Legacy"
Kip S. Thorne, Richard P. Feynman Professor of Theoretical Physics, California Institute of Technology
1995 : "Nuclear Weapons: Where Do We Go From Here?"
Sidney D. Drell, MacArthur Fellow, 1984-1989, Professor and Deputy Director Stanford Linear Accelerator Center
1996 : "In Search of the Fundamental Building Blocks of Nature"
Samuel C.C. Ting, Nobel Laureate in Physics, 1976, Thomas Dudley Cabot Institute Professor, Massachusetts Institute of Technology
1997 : "Two Atmospheric Problems: Ozone Depletion and Global Warming"
F. Sherwood Rowland, Nobel Laureate in Chemistry, 1995, Donald Bren Research Professor of Chemistry, University of California, Irvine
1998 : "Superfluidity in Helium Three: The Discovery Through the Eyes of a Graduate Student"
Douglas D. Osherfoff, Nobel Laureate in Physics, 1996, MacArthur Fellow, 1981-1986, Professor of Physics and Applied Physics, Stanford University
1999 : "Holding onto Atoms and Molecules with Laser Light"
Steven Chu, Nobel Laureate in Physics, 1997, Theodore and Frances Geballe Professor of Physics and Applied Physics, Stanford University
2000 : "Electronic Structure of Matter: Wave Functions and Density Functionals"
Walter Kohn, Nobel Laureate in Chemistry, 1998, Professor of Physics, Emeritus, and Research Professor, University of California, Santa Barbara
2001 : "Viruses: The Essence of Life, but Sneaky Critters"
David Baltimore, Nobel Laureate in Physiology or Medicine, 1975, National Medal of Science Recipient, 1999, President, California Institute of Technology
2002 : "Freezing Time"
Ahmed H. Zewail, Nobel Laureate in Chemistry, 1999, Linus Pauling Professor of Chemistry and Professor of Physics, California Institute of Technology
2003 : "Light at Bicycle Speed ...and Slower Yet!"
Lene Vestergaard Hau, MacArthur Fellow, 2001-2006, Gordon McKay Professor of Applied Physics and Professor of Physics, Lyman Laboratory, Harvard University
2004 : "Can Nuclear Weapons Proliferation Be Stopped?"
Wolfgang K. H. Panofsky, Ph.D., Professor and Director Emeritus, Stanford Linear Accelerator Center, Stanford University
2005 : "What Can We Do With A Quantum Liquid?"
Anthony J. Leggett, Nobel Laureate in Physics, 2003, MacArthur Fellow, Professor and Advanced Studies Professor of Physics, University of Illinois at Urbana–Champaign 
2006 : "The Future of Physics"
David J. Gross, Nobel Laureate in Physics, 2004, Director, Kavli Institute for Theoretical Physics, University of California, Santa Barbara, Frederick W. Gluck Professor of Theoretical Physics
2007 : "Small Wonders: The World of Nanoscience"
Horst L. Stormer, Nobel Laureate in Physics, 1998, Isidor Isaac Rabi Professor of Physics, Columbia University, New York, Adjunct Physics Vice President, Bell Labs, Lucent Technologies, Murray Hills, NJ
2008 : "Why are we so excited about carbon nanostructures?"
Mildred S. Dresselhaus, Ph.D., Institute Professor of Electrical Engineering and Physics, Massachusetts Institute of Technology;
President of the American Physical Society (1984) and President of the American Association for the Advancement of Science (1997)
2009 : "Unveiling a black hole at the center of our galaxy"
Andrea M. Ghez, Ph.D., Professor of Physics and Astronomy, UCLA; MacArthur Fellow (2008); Sackler Prize(2004); National Academy of Sciences and American Academy of Arts and Sciences (elected)
2010 : "How Science Changed California and The West"
Kevin Owen Starr, PhD, Professor of History at USC and California's State Librarian Emeritus.

References

American radiologists
University of Southern California alumni
University of Southern California faculty
Academic staff of the University of Copenhagen
1925 births
1984 deaths
Place of birth missing
20th-century American physicists